Lejiang is a town in Longsheng Various Nationalities Autonomous County, Guangxi, China.

Administrative division
As of 2016, the town is divided into thirteen villages: 
 Jinping
 Lejiang
 Jiangkou
 Liangping
 Shijing
 Shijia
 Guangming
 Dujing
 Diling
 Daxiong
 Baozeng
 Tongle
 Xiyao

History
It belonged to Piaoli Township between December 1949 and September 1987. On September 17, 1987, some villages separated from Piaoli Township and formed Lejiang Township. On November 16, 2018, it was upgraded to a town.

On December 9, 2016, the villages of Baozeng, Diling and Shijia was listed among the fourth group of "List of Traditional Villages in China" by the State Council of China.

Geography
The town is situated at northwestern Longsheng Various Nationalities Autonomous County. It borders Weijiang Township and Pingdeng Town in the northeast, Piaoli Town in the south, and Tongdao Dong Autonomous County in the northwest.

There are ten rivers and streams in the town. The Xun River winds through the town.

Economy
The region abounds with jade, coal, copper, antimony, and marble.

Transportation
The G65 Baotou–Maoming Expressway, more commonly known as "Bao-Mao Expressway", runs west to east through the southern town.

References

Bibliography

Towns of Guilin